Riccardo Rossini (born 8 November 1993) is an Italian professional footballer who plays as a midfielder for Serie D club Casale.

Club career
On 25 August 2021, Rossini joined to Serie D club Casale.

References

External links

1993 births
Living people
Footballers from Milan
Italian footballers
Association football midfielders
Serie C players
Serie D players
Promozione players
A.S. Giana Erminio players
Piacenza Calcio 1919 players
Rende Calcio 1968 players
Casale F.B.C. players